Ricardo García Rodríguez (3 December 1930 – 14 June 2022) was a Chilean lawyer and politician who served as minister.

References

External link
Course Hero Profile 

1930 births
2022 deaths
Chilean people
20th-century Chilean politicians
Pontifical Catholic University of Valparaíso alumni
Christian Democratic Party (Chile) politicians